The 1938 Portland Pilots football team was an American football team that represented the University of Portland as an independent during the 1938 college football season. In its second year under head coach Robert L. Mathews, the team compiled a 5–3 record. The team played its home games at Multnomah Stadium in Portland, Oregon.

Schedule

References

Portland
Portland Pilots football seasons
Portland Pilots football
Portland Pilots football